Elizabeth Palmer Caffin  is a writer, editor and publisher from New Zealand.

Caffin began her publishing career with a position at Reed Publishing in 1976. She was later the director of Auckland University Press for more than ten years. She is a kaitiaki of the Alexander Turnbull Library, and has served on a number of arts bodies including the Queen Elizabeth II Arts Council, the Press Council, the Literary Fund Advisory Council and Book Publishers Association of New Zealand.

Publications 
 Introducing Katherine Mansfield (1982), Longman Paul
 The Deepening Stream: A History of the New Zealand Literary Fund (with Andrew Mason, 2016), Victoria University Press
 Allen Curnow: Collected Poems (with Terry Sturm, 2017), Auckland University Press

Recognition 
In the 2005 Queen's Birthday Honours, Caffin was appointed a Member of the New Zealand Order of Merit, for services to literature. In 2009, she was awarded an honorary doctorate by the University of Auckland.

References

Living people
New Zealand publishers (people)
Members of the New Zealand Order of Merit
Year of birth missing (living people)
20th-century New Zealand women writers
20th-century New Zealand writers